Ranomafana National Park is a national park in southeastern Madagascar, in the Haute Matsiatra and Vatovavy regions. It was established as Madagascar's fourth national park in 1991 following the rediscovery of the greater bamboo lemur (Hapalemur simus) and the discovery of the golden bamboo lemur (Hapalemur aureus) by the primatologist Dr. Patricia Wright.  

The park protects more than 41,600 hectares (161 square miles) of tropical rainforest at elevations ranging from 800 to 1,200 m (2,645 to 3,937 ft) and is home to several rare species of plants and animals. It was later integrated into the UNESCO World Heritage Site Rainforests of the Atsinanana. The Centre ValBio research station is adjacent to the park and was created in 2003 by Stony Brook University for biodiversity research, community health and education, environmental arts, and reforestation.  

The park's name is derived from the Malagasy words  ("hot water") due to the hot springs in the nearby town of Ranomafana.

Fauna & Flora 
The range of altitudes in the park produces a variety of forest types, including lowland rainforest and cloud forest. These forests support high levels of biodiversity. The park hosts 90 species of butterflies, 112 species of frogs, 22 species of lizards, 22 species of snake, and 118 species of birds, 30 of which are endemic to the park. Notable birds include ground rollers, blue vangas, short-legged ground rollers and brown mesites.

Scientific research
There are four main sites for scientific research. Talatakely is located within walking distance of Centre ValBio and is also accessible to tourists off of Route 25. Talatakely is the site of the original research camp and is one of the few locations in the park where Prolemur simus can be seen. The three remaining research sites (Vatoharanana, Valohoaka, and Mangevo) maintain bush camp facilities. In addition to these main sites, research has been conducted throughout the park.

Tourism

As with all national parks in Madagascar, a local guide is required for visitors entering the park. It has seven hiking trails that vary in length from 10 to 20 km (6.2 to 12.4 mi) and offer opportunities for birdwatching, viewing lemurs, and seeing waterfalls.

Talatakely has well-defined paths and stairs, although sturdy shoes should be worn as the path can be slippery when wet. Specialist guides can be arranged through Centre ValBio for excursions. 

Kayaking or canoeing can also be arranged and a hot springs pool is located in Ranomafana.

Lodging
There is a private ecolodge administered by a private tourist operator at the entrance of the national park. There are also several hotels in Ranomafana village. Additionally, it is possible to camp at the campsite near the main road through the park or to find lodging at Centre ValBio, where most of the scientific research is based.

The park office is at the entrance to the village of Ambodiamontana,  from the town of Ranomafana. The park is crossed by National Road 25 and National Road 45.

See also
 List of national parks of Madagascar
 Fauna of Madagascar

References

External links

 www.parcs-madagascar.com

Protected areas established in 1991
National parks of Madagascar
Haute Matsiatra
Vatovavy
1991 establishments in Madagascar
Madagascar subhumid forests
Important Bird Areas of Madagascar